Rupert Shrive (born 1965) is an English artist who was born in West Runton.

His interest in art started at the age of six, copying Uccello's Saint George and the Dragon.  He attended Norwich School of Art and had a studio above the Coach and Horses in Soho for five years, where he met Francis Bacon.  Among his subjects was Soho Pam, a homeless beggar who peddled copies of his watercolour portrait of her.

References

English artists
Alumni of Norwich University of the Arts
Living people
1965 births
People from West Runton